Kashe Quest (born in June 22, 2018) is an American child genius who is the youngest member of American Mensa, having joined at 2 years old.

Quest was born in Los Angeles County, California to an Indian-American mother Sukhjit Athwal (also known as Sue or Jit), who is a child development expert from Northern California, and African-American father Devon, a law clerk. Quest's pediatrician noticed she could already speak with advanced syntax and have dialogue in complete sentences at 18 months old; so they recommended that she be tested by a psychologist who administered the Mensa test, in which she scored 146, certifying her as a genius. She can correctly identify every American state, every continent, branches of government, identify every element on the periodic table, in addition to learning Spanish and American Sign Language.

Quest has been featured on ABC World News Tonight, The Today Show, and interviewed on Jimmy Kimmel Live.

References 

2018 births
Living people
Mensans
People from Los Angeles
American children
American people of Indian descent
African-American people